Narsaq Heliport  is a heliport in the northwestern part of Narsaq, a town in the Kujalleq municipality, in southern Greenland.

The route of the Arctic Umiaq Line no longer extends to Narsarsuaq during summer, hence the need for Europe-bound passengers to transfer in Narsaq Heliport, with several daily departures to Narsarsuaq.

Airlines and destinations

Photographs

References

Heliports in Greenland